The Church of England Evangelical Council (CEEC) is an association of mainly conservative evangelical Anglican members of the Church of England. It self-describes as the collective voice of all evangelicals within the Church of England, and states its aim "to promote and maintain orthodox evangelical theology and ethics at the heart of the Church of England". It has been described as theologically conservative. It was founded in 1960 by the Anglican clergyman John Stott. It is a registered with the Charity Commission for England and Wales: amongst its stated activities is the "promotion of consultation between evangelical Anglican leaders" and "to encourage and interact with evangelicals within the Church of England".

Membership
Member of the council include bishops, representatives from mission societies and associations, and laypeople. Organisations affiliated with the council include Anglican Mainstream, Anglican Mission in England, Church Mission Society, Church Pastoral Aid Society, Church Society, Crosslinks, Reform, Fulcrum, and New Wine: the organisations are mainly conservative evangelical, but also include some which are open evangelical or charismatic in orientation.

Since April 2021, the National Director of the CEEC has been Keith Sinclair, formerly the Bishop of Birkenhead. Its president is currently Julian Henderson, Bishop of Blackburn.

References

Evangelicalism in the Church of England
Christian organisations based in the United Kingdom
Christian organizations established in 1960